In electricity supply design, a ring circuit is an electrical wiring technique in which sockets and the distribution point are connected in a ring.  It is contrasted with the usual radial circuit, in which sockets and the distribution point are connected in a line with the distribution point at one end.

Ring circuits are also known as ring final circuits and often incorrectly as ring mains, a term used historically, or informally simply as rings.

It is used primarily in the United Kingdom, where it was developed, and to a lesser extent in Ireland and Hong Kong.

This design enables the use of smaller-diameter wire than would be used in a radial circuit of equivalent total current capacity. The reduced diameter conductors in the flexible cords connecting an appliance to the plug intended for use with sockets on a ring circuit are individually protected by a fuse in the plug. Its advantages over radial circuits are therefore reduced quantity of copper used, and greater flexibility of appliances and equipment that can be connected.

Ideally, the ring circuit acts like two radial circuits proceeding in opposite directions around the ring, the dividing point between them dependent on the distribution of load in the ring.  If the load is evenly split across the two directions, the current in each direction is half of the total, allowing the use of wire with half the total current-carrying capacity.  In practice, the load does not always split evenly, so thicker wire is used.

Description

The ring starts at the consumer unit (also known as fuse box, distribution board, or breaker box), visits each socket in turn, and then returns to the consumer unit. The ring is fed from a fuse or circuit breaker in the consumer unit.

Ring circuits are commonly used in British wiring with socket-outlets taking fused plugs to BS 1363. Because the breaker rating is much higher than that of any one socket outlet, the system can only be used with fused plugs or fused appliance outlets. They are generally wired with 2.5 mm2 cable and protected by a 30 A fuse, an older 30 A circuit breaker, or a European harmonised 32 A circuit breaker. Sometimes 4 mm2 cable is used if very long cable runs (to help reduce voltage drop) or derating factors such as very thick thermal insulation are involved. 1.5 mm2 mineral-insulated copper-clad cable (known as pyro) may also be used (as mineral insulated cable can withstand heat more effectively than normal PVC) though more care must be taken with regard to voltage drop on longer runs.  The protection devices for the fixed wiring need to be rated higher than would protect flexible appliance cords, so BS 1363 requires that all plugs and connection units incorporate fuses appropriate to the appliance cord.

History and use
The ring circuit and the associated BS 1363 plug and socket system were developed in Britain during 1942–1947.  They are commonly used in the United Kingdom and to a lesser extent in the Republic of Ireland. They are also found in the United Arab Emirates, Singapore, Hong Kong, Beijing, Indonesia and many places where the UK had a strong influence, including for example Cyprus and Uganda.

Pre-World War II practice was to use various sizes of plugs and sockets to suit the current requirement of the appliance, and these were connected to suitably fused radial circuits; the ratings of those fuses were appropriate to protect both the fixed wiring and the flexible cord attached to the plug.

The Electrical Installations Committee which was convened in 1942 as part of the Post War Building Studies programme determined, amongst other things, that the ring final circuit offered a more efficient and lower cost system which would safely support a greater number of sockets.  The scheme was specified to use 13 A socket-outlets and fused plugs; several designs for the plugs and sockets were considered. The design chosen as the British Standard was the flat pin system now known as BS 1363.  Other designs of 13 A fused plugs and socket-outlets, notably the Wylex and Dorman & Smith systems, which did not conform to the chosen standard, were used into the 1950s, but by the 1960s BS 1363 had become the single standard for new installations.

The committee mandated the ring circuit both to increase consumer safety and to combat the anticipated post-war copper shortage. The committee estimated that using ring-circuit and single-pole fusing would reduce raw materials requirements by approximately 25% compared with pre-war regulations.

The ring circuit is still the most common mains wiring configuration in the UK, although both  20 A and 30 A radial circuits are also permitted by the Wiring Regulations, with a recommendation based on the floor area served (20 A for area up to 25 m2, 30 A for up to  100 m2.).

Installation rules

Rules for ring circuits provide that the cable rating must be no less than two thirds of the rating of the protective device. This means that the risk of sustained overloading of the cable can be considered minimal. In practice, however, it is extremely uncommon to encounter a ring with a protective device other than a 30 A fuse, 30 A breaker, or 32 A breaker, and a cable size other than those mentioned above. Because the BS 1363 plug contains a fuse not exceeding 13A, the load at any one point on the ring is limited.

The IET Wiring Regulations (BS 7671) permit an unlimited number of 13A socket outlets (at any point unfused single or double, or any number fused) to be installed on a ring circuit, provided that the floor area served does not exceed 100 m2. In practice, most small and medium houses have one ring circuit per storey, with larger premises having more.

An installation designer may determine if additional circuits are required for areas of high demand.  For example, it is common practice to put kitchens on their own ring circuit or sometimes a ring circuit shared with a utility room to avoid putting a heavy load at one point on the main downstairs ring circuit. Since any load on a ring is fed by the ring conductors on either side of it, it is desirable to avoid a concentrated load placed very near the consumer unit, since the shorter conductors will have less resistance and carry a disproportionate share of the load.

Unfused spurs from a ring wired in the same cable as the ring are allowed to run one socket (single or double) or one fused connection unit (FCU). Before 1970 the use of two single sockets on one spur was allowed, but has since been disallowed because of their conversion to double sockets. Spurs may either start from a socket or be joined to the ring cable with a junction box or other approved method of joining cables. BS 1363 compliant triple and larger sockets are always fused at 13A and therefore can also be placed on a spur. Since 1970 it is  permitted to have more spurs than sockets on the ring, but it is considered poor practice by many electricians to have too many unfused spurs in a new installation.

Where loads other than BS 1363 sockets are connected to a ring circuit or it is desired to place more than one socket for low power equipment on a spur, a BS 1363 fused connection unit (FCU) is used. In the case of fixed appliances this will be a switched fused connection unit (SFCU) to provide a point of isolation for the appliance, but in other cases such as feeding multiple lighting points (putting lighting on a ring though is generally considered bad practice in new installation but is often done when adding lights to an existing property) or multiple sockets, an unswitched one is often preferable.

Fixed appliances with a power rating of 3 kW or more (for example, water heaters and some electric cookers) or with a non-trivial power demand for long periods (for example, immersion heaters) may be connected to a ring circuit, but it is strongly recommended that instead they are connected to their own dedicated circuit. However, there are plenty of older installations with such loads on a ring circuit.

Advantages

Proponents of the ring circuit point out that, when correctly installed, there are also a number of advantages to be considered.

Area served
For rooms that are square or circular, a ring circuit can deliver more power per unit of floor area for a given cable size than a simple radial circuit, and the source impedance and therefore voltage drop to the  furthest point is lower. Alternatively, to deliver the same power to the same building with radial circuits would require more final circuits or a heavier cable.

High integrity earthing
As all fittings on the ring are earthed from both sides, two independent faults are needed to create an 'off earth' fault.

Continuous continuity verification from any point
The continuity of each conductor right round all the points on the ring can be verified from any point, and if this needs to be done as part of live installation monitoring, it can be verified by current clamp injection with the system energised.

Criticism
The ring final circuit concept has been criticized in a number of ways compared to radials, and some of these concerns could explain the lack of widespread adoption outside the United Kingdom.

Fault conditions are not apparent when in use
Ring circuits may continue to operate without the user being aware of any problem if there are certain types of fault condition or installation errors. This gives both robustness against failure and a potential for danger.

Safety tests are complex
At least one author claims that testing ring circuits may take 5–6 times longer than testing radial circuits. The installation tests required for the safe operation of a ring circuit are  more time-consuming than those for a radial circuit, and DIY installers or electricians qualified in other countries may not be familiar with them.

Load balance required
Regulation 433-02-04 of BS 7671 requires that the installed load must be distributed around the ring such that no part of the cable exceeds its rated capacity. In some cases this requirement is difficult to guarantee, and may be largely ignored in practice, as loads are often co-located (e.g., washing machine, tumble dryer, dish washer all next to kitchen sink) at a point not necessarily near the centre of the ring. However, the fact that the cable rating is 67% that of the circuit breaker, not 50%, means that a ring has to be significantly out of balance to cause a problem.

In a ring circuit, if any poor joint causes a high resistance on one branch of the ring, current will be unevenly distributed, possibly overloading the remaining conductor of the ring.

See also
 Electrical wiring in the United Kingdom

References

External links
 Ring Circuit wiring guide

Electrical wiring
Electricity supply circuits